The mass media in Turkey includes a wide variety of domestic and foreign periodicals expressing disparate views, and domestic newspapers are extremely competitive. However, media ownership is concentrated in the hands of a few large private media groups which are typically part of wider conglomerates controlled by wealthy individuals, which limits the views that are presented. In addition, the companies are willing to use their influence to support their owners' wider business interests, including by trying to maintain friendly relations with the government. The media exert a strong influence on public opinion. Censorship in Turkey is also an issue, and in the 2000s Turkey has seen many journalists arrested and writers prosecuted. On Reporters Without Borders' Press Freedom Index it has fallen from being ranked around 100 in 2005 to around 150 in 2013.

In reaction to the failed coup d'état on 15 July 2016, over 150 media organisations, including newspapers, television and radio channels, news agencies, magazines and publishing houses, have been closed by the government of Turkey, and 160 journalists have been jailed.

By circulation, the most popular daily newspapers are Sabah, Sözcü, Hürriyet, Posta, and Milliyet. The broadcast media have a very high penetration as satellite dishes and cable systems are widely available. The "Radio and Television Supreme Council" (RTÜK) is the government body overseeing the broadcast media. In 2003 a total of 257 television stations and 1,100 radio stations were licensed to operate, and others operated without licenses. Of those licensed, 16 television and 36 radio stations reached national audiences. In 2003 some 22.9 million televisions and 11.3 million radios were in service. Aside from Turkish, the state television network offers some programs in Arabic, Circassian, Kurdish, and Zaza.

Turkish consumers are the second-most media illiterate when compared to countries in Europe, leaving them especially vulnerable to fake news, according to a 2018 study. A combination of low education levels, low reading scores, low media freedom and low societal trust went into making the score, which saw Turkey being placed second lowest only to North Macedonia. Conspiracy theories are a prevalent phenomenon in Turkish media. According to the Reuters Institute Digital News Report 2018, Turkey was the country where people complained the most about completely made-up stories.

Legislative framework

The Constitution of Turkey, at art. 28, states that the press is free and shall not be censored. Yet, Constitutional guarantees are undermined by restrictive provisions in the Criminal Code, Criminal Procedure Code, and anti-terrorism laws, effectively leaving prosecutors and judges with ample discretion to repress ordinary journalistic activities. The Turkish judiciary can and do censure media outlets under other constitutional provisions and loosely interpreted laws, such as “protecting basic characteristics of the Republic” and “safeguarding the indivisible integrity of the State with its territory and nation.”  

Freedom of information principles have been introduced with the April 2004 Right to Information Act, affording to citizens and legal persons the right to request information from public institutions and private organizations that qualify as public institutions, although the implementation of the law is lacking.

The 2007 Press Law was coupled with a “Regulation of Publications on the Internet and Suppression of Crimes Committed Through Such Publications”, authorising the Telecommunications Communication Presidency (TIB) to execute court orders to block websites and to issue blocking orders for the content providers in or outside Turkey for committing crimes such as child pornography, encouraging drug use and, especially, crimes against Atatürk. Between 2007 and 2010 around 3,700 websites and platforms including YouTube, MySpace, and GeoCities have been blocked.

Status and self-regulation of journalists
Media professionals in Turkey face job insecurity and lack of social security, being often forced to work without contract and outside the protection provided by the Law 212 on the rights of journalists. Without a contact under Law 212 media workers in Turkey cannot obtain a press badge and cannot take part in the Turkish Journalists Union (Türkiye Gazeteciler Sendikası, TGS)

Turkey's 2001 financial crisis further strengthened media owners' hands, as 3–5,000 journalists were fired, and the most troublesome ones targeted first.

Some themes have long remained quasi-taboo in the Turkish media, including the role of the Army, the Cyprus issue and the rights of the Kurdish and Armenian minorities. The interests of media owners in the major media conglomerates inevitably cast a shadow over the objectivity and independence of the controlled media outlets.

Ethics in Turkish journalism is based on a couple of documents: the “Declaration of Rights and Responsibilities” by Turkish Journalists Association (1998) and the “Code of Professional Ethics of the Press” by Turkish Press Council (1989).

In 2006 RTÜK introduced a voluntary ombudsman mechanism that media outlets can introduce in order to evaluate their audience's reactions. Yet, ombudsmen lack independence, as they are high-ranking employees of the same media groups.

Media outlets

Turkey hosts around 3,100 newspapers, including 180 national ones. Only 15% of these are daily newspapers. Turkish print outlets privilege columns and opinions over pure news, and are often politically polarised. Broadcast media include hundreds of TV stations and thousands of radio stations including some in minority languages. The introduction of  Kurdish-language media has been hailed as a big progress, although their quality remains poor.

The main issues concerning mainstream media in Turkey are the heavy concentration of ownership, the widespread self-censorship of journalists and media professionals (also due to their vulnerability to political powers) and the presence of nationalist rhetoric and hate speech.

More than two thirds of the media (national newspapers, radio and TV channels) are owned by few cross-media groups, whose activities expand in other economic sectors (tourism, finance, auto, construction and banking). These media conglomerates thus rely on alliances with parts of the political and bureaucratic elites to sustain their business interests. As a result, the media landscape of Turkey is highly diverse but also very biased and nationalistic, and media coverage and critical positions reflects media owners' preferences and interests. Independent journalism is a rare and dangerous endeavour, at risk of high job insecurity.

The centralisation of public procurement decisions within the prime minister's office (which controls the Privatization High Council (OİB), the Housing Development Administration (TOKİ), and the Defence Industry Executive Committee) has stepped up the economic leverage of the government towards economic conglomerates that also control Turkish media. 
 Leaked conversations showed how in 2013 the government dictated which companies were to purchase the Sabah-ATV group, in exchange for the tenders related to the construction of Istanbul's third airport.
 In November 2013 the Savings Deposit and Insurance Fund (TMSF) was used to transfer media assets to supportive businessmen. The AKP-friendly businessman Ethem Sancak bought from TMSF three media that were previously owned by the Çukurova Group.

In 2004 three major media groups dominated advertising revenues: Doğan Media Group and Sabah took 80% of newspaper advertising, and Doğan, Sabah and Çukurova took 70% of television advertising. In the Turkish context, highly concentrated corporate media power (such as Dogan’s) is even more significant when three additional factors are considered: (1) the willingness of corporate owners to ‘instrumentalize’ reporting in order to fit the wider political-economic interests of the parent company; (2) the weakness of journalists and other employees in the face of the power of corporate owners; and (3) the fact that corporate power is combined with restrictive state regulation on issues of freedom of speech.
 Doğan Media Group (Aydın Doğan / Arzuhan Yalçındağ) had two-thirds of all newspaper advertising revenue in 2004, and following the 2005 purchase of Star TV had 25-30% of the TV audience. (It sold Star TV to Doğuş Media Group in 2011).
 Doğuş Media Group (Ayhan Şahenk / Ferit Şahenk)
 Turkuvaz Media Group of Çalık Holding (Ahmet Çalık)
 Çukurova Media Group of Çukurova Holding (Mehmet Emin Karamehmet)
 Ciner Media Group (Turgay Ciner)

The broadcast media have a very high penetration as satellite dishes and cable systems are widely available. The "Radio and Television Supreme Council" (RTÜK) is the government body overseeing the broadcast media.

TV channels gather around half of the advertising market revenues, i.e. 1 billion dollars (56% in 2005, 50% in 2008, 48.2% in 2009). The share of the print media (36% in 2005, 33% in 2008, 31.2% in 2009) and of the radio (3.4% in 2005, 3.3% in 2009) are in decline too. The advertising market is deemed relatively small when compared to the number of media, thus endangering the survival of the smaller media and constituting a barrier to the entry of new actors in the market. Turkish media also remain dependent on revenues from other activities of the economic conglomerates that own them.

Print media

Newspapers with oppositional editorial line against the government corresponds to 65% of daily newspapers in circulation while pro-government newspapers's share is 25%.

The total number of readers of print media in Turkey is low, when compared to the big population of the country (95 newspapers per 1000 inhabitants). Circulating newspapers where estimated at around 2,450 in 2010, of which 5 national, 23 regional and other local ones.

The media hubs of the country are Istanbul and Ankara. By circulation, the most popular daily newspapers are Hürriyet (330,000 daily sales in 2016), Sabah (300,000), Posta (290,000), Sözcü and Habertürk. Major Turkish daily newspapers are published every day of the year, including Sundays, religious and secular public holidays.

Big media conglomerates, with substantial interests in other economic sectors, dominate the media market and own all the major print and broadcast media. These are the Doğan Group, Turkuvaz, Ciner Group, Çukurova Group and Doğuş Group:
 The Doğan Group is the largest Turkish media conglomerate. It owns the mainstream/conservative daily Hürriyet, the boulevard daily Posta, the sports daily Fanatik (190,000), the business daily Referans (11,000), and the English-language daily Hürriyet Daily News (5,500). The group faced serious fiscal troubles in 2009.
 The Turkuvaz Group, owned by the Çalık Holding, has connections with the ruling party AKP. It owns the mainstream daily Sabah, the boulevard daily Takvim (120,000), the sports daily Fotomaç (200,000), and the most prominent regional newspaper Yeni Asır (40,000).
 The Ciner Group launched Gazete Habertürk in March 2009, thus entering the media market.
 The Çukurova Group owns the nationalist dailies Akşam (150,000), Tercüman (15,000), and the boulevard paper Güneş (110,000).
The Albayrak business group publishes the conservative Islamic daily Yeni Şafak (100,000).
Demirören Holding publishes the dailies Milliyet and Vatan.
 The Milli Gazete daily (50,000) is deemed to be the voice of Milli Görüş, a vision promoted by religious-conservative parties in the 1990s such as Necmettin Erbakan's National Salvation Party in the 1970s and Welfare party during the 1990s. 
 Vakit (50,000) is a more radical and sensationalist Islamic daily, which has been subject to several prosecutions.  
 The Cumhuriyet daily (55,000), once linked to the left, is now the reference newspaper for Kemalists and nationalist groups linked to the main opposition CHP party.
 Star (100,000) was launched by the businessman Ethem Sancak as an Islamic and liberal daily.

Magazines and periodicals too have a low circulation when compared with Turkey's population. The main ones are Tempo, Turkuvaz Group's Yeni Aktüel (8,000), and Newsweek Türkiye (5,000). Business magazines include Ekonomist and Para (around 9,000 copies each). Birikim is a well-reputed liberal-left journal, publishing elaborate articles on social and political issues.

Minority newspapers include IHO and Apoyevmatini in Greek language; Agos, Jamanak and Nor Marmara in Armenian language; and Şalom by the Jewish community. Their survival is often at stake.

Distribution networks are in the hands of Doğan Group’s Yay-Sat and Turkuvaz Group’s Turkuvaz Dağıtım Pazarlama.

Publishing

Radio broadcasting

Radio enjoys a large number of listeners in the Turkey. There are more than 1000 radio stations in the country. 
The first attempts at radio broadcasting began in 1921 in Istanbul, Turkey. The first radio broadcast in Turkey began on May 6, 1927. In 1927, New York City, London, Berlin, Vienna, Moscow and Tehran connection was established. In 1945, Turkey's first university radio with ITU Radio was established. First state radio, on May 1, 1964 TRT Radio began broadcasts, holding monopoly in radio broadcasting until 1994. Establishment of private radio stations began in the early 1990s by young visionary entrepreneurs. The first comers were Energy FM founded by Vedat Yelkenci who also launched the first Music Television TV channels Genc TV <https://tr.wikipedia.org/wiki/Genç_TV> and thereafter the Number One-MTV under licence by MTV Europe, Number one FM, launched by Omer Karacan and Ali Karacan, Genc Radyo launched by Osman Ataman, Power FM launched by Cem Hakko, Super FM and Kral FM launched by Cem Uzan, Capital Radio launched by Kalafatoglu. Internet radio in the late 1990s began to be established.

In 2010 Turkey had around 1,100 private radio stations, of which 100 available on cable - 36 national ones, 102 regional ones, and 950 local ones. TRT four radio channels include Radyo 1 (general), Radyo 2 (TRT-FM) (Turkish classical, folk and pop music), Radyo 3 (primarily classical music and also jazz, polyphonic and western pop music, broadcasts news in English, French and German), and Radyo 4 (Turkish Music). TRT's international radio service Türkiye‘nin Sesi / Voice of Turkey broadcasts in 26 languages. TRT also has 10 regional radio stations.

Private radio stations offer mainly music programmes; the most popular ones are Kral FM (Turkish pop music), Süper FM (Western pop music), Metro FM (Western pop music), Power Türk (Turkish pop music), and Best FM (Turkish pop music). Several independent radio stations also broadcast in Turkey, including Istanbul's Açık Radyo (Open Radio), the first to be financially supported by listeners, and encouraging listeners to participate in public discussions on sensitive issues to promote open dialogue.

An Armenian-language internet radio, Nor Radio, started broadcasting in 2009.

Television broadcasting

Television is the main information and entertainment source in Turkey. Turks have an average daily TV viewing time of 3.5 hours per person (3.45 during weekends), according to a RTÜK survey.

Television was introduced in Turkey in 1968 by the government media provider TRT, preceded by the first Turkish television channel ITU TV in 1952. Color television was introduced in 1981. TRT held a monopoly as state-owned public broadcaster for twenty years, until on 26 May 1989 Turkey's first private television channel Star TV started its broadcasts from Germany - thus legally not breaching the regulations. In the following years more than 100 local TVs and 500 local radio stations began operating without licenses. The TRT official monopoly was finally lifted in August 1993, with a Constitutional amendment, liberalizing private broadcasting. The newcomers were, Erol Aksoy launching Show TV, Cem Uzan and Ahmet Ozal launching Interstar (later named as Star TV), Vedat Yelkenci launching the first Music TV Genc TV and thereafter Number One MTV together with Karacan Brothers

Today the public broadcaster TRT has 11 national television channels: TRT 1 (general), TRT 2 (culture and art), TRT 3 (youth channel with sports and music programs and live broadcasts from the Grand National Assembly of Turkey at specific hours), TRT 4 (education), TRT Müzik (wide range of music from traditional Turkish music to jazz). It also broadcasts a regional channel TRT GAP for the southeastern region of Turkey, and two international channels TRT Türk for Europe, USA and Australia, and TRT Avaz for the Balkans, Central Asia and Caucasus. A full-time Kurdish-language channel, TRT 6, was launched in 2009 within the democratization process.

Turkey's television market included 24 national, 16 regional and 215 local television stations in 2010. It is defined by a handful of big channels led by Kanal D, ATV and Show, with 14%, 10% and 9.6% market share in 2013, respectively.

The main media conglomerates own all major TV channels: Demirören Group owns Kanal D, Star TV and CNN Türk, Turkuvaz Group owns ATV, Çukurova Group owns Show TV and Sky Turk 360, Ciner Group owns Habertürk and Doğuş Group owns NTV. Kanal 7 is deemed controlled by  Milli Görüş. Star Media Group owns Kanal 24 as well as the Star daily. In 2006 Rupert Murdoch bought the majority of İhlas Group’s TGRT channel.

The main private TV channels, as well as TRT 1, offer a similar mix of entertainment and news. Samanyolu and Kanal 7 are the channels with a more religious editorial line. Roj TV is a pro-PKK channel broadcasting in Kurdish language via satellite, rather popular in the South-East. Thematic TV channels include the 24/7 news channels NTV, CNN Türk (a joint venture with CNN International), Habertürk, Sky Turk 360, and TGRT Haber. Music channels include Kral TV and Number One TV.
The quality of audiovisual media is limited by a lack of diversity and creativity among the media, and a "monolithic understanding of television broadcasting" given the quick imitation of popular programmes across channels.

The most important reception platforms are terrestrial and satellite, with almost 50% of homes using satellite (of these 15% were pay services) at the end of 2009. Three services dominate the multi-channel market: the satellite platforms Digitürk and D-Smart and the cable TV service Türksat.

Cinema

The Turkish film art and industry, or Yeşilçam (Green Pine), is an important part of Turkish culture, and has flourished over the years, delivering entertainment to audiences in Turkey, expatriates across Europe, and more recently prospering in the Arab world and in rare cases, the United States. The first movie exhibited in the Ottoman Empire was the Lumiere Brothers' 1895 film, L'Arrivée d'un train en gare de La Ciotat, which was shown in Istanbul in 1896. The first Turkish-made film was a documentary entitled Ayastefanos'taki Rus Abidesinin Yıkılışı (Demolition of the Russian Monument at San Stefano), directed by Fuat Uzkınay and completed in 1914. The first narrative film, Sedat Simavi's The Spy, was released in 1917. Turkey's first sound film was shown in 1931.

The number of cinema spectator has risen since 2000, in parallel to economic growth, political liberalisation and improved quality of theatres. In 2009, around 255 movies were distributed in Turkey, with a reach of 35 million, of which 70 Turkish movies, which capitalised half of the audience. The cinema audience though remains below European average, and limited to the main cities.

40 movies are produced yearly in Turkey. Award-winning Turkish films have often been supported by the European Union Eurimages film fund and by the Turkish Ministry of Culture, sometimes attracting more audience abroad than domestically. Two Turkish film companies have been bought by foreign investors in 2007 (Cinemars by USA's Colony Capital and AFM by Eurasia Cinemas from Russia).

Telecommunications

Türk Telekom was established in 1995 as a state-owned company after the separation of postal and telecommunication services. It was privatized in 2005 (55% Oger Telecom, 30% state-owned, 15% public shares). In March 2009 it hosted 17.3 million land line phone users, 6 million ADSL users, and 12.6 million GSM users.

The telecommunications liberalisation process started in Turkey in 2004 after the creation of the Telecommunication Authority, and is still ongoing as of May 2013.  Private sector companies operate in mobile telephony, long distance telephony and Internet access.  There were 16.5 million fixed phone lines, 62.8 million mobile phone subscribers, and 6.2 million broadband subscribers by December 2009.

Telecommunications liberalisation in Turkey is progressing, but at a slow pace.  The Telecommunication Authority (now renamed Bilgi İletişim ve Teknolojileri Kurumu or BTK), while technically an independent organization, is still controlled by the Ministry of Transport and Communications.

While progress is being made (for example, local as well as long distance calls are now open to competition), the incumbent has so far managed in many areas to restrict access and protect its monopoly.  For example, wholesale line rental is still not available to alternative operators, making it necessary for subscribers to pay two bills (one for line rental to the incumbent, and one to the chosen operator). The incumbent has so far managed to prevent any operator from connecting its own fiber optic cable at local loop unbundling exchanges, though it is technically required to allow this.  Recently, the incumbent announced it is acquiring Invitel, one of only two other players in the inter-city capacity business, raising questions as to how the Turkish Competition Board will treat the acquisition.

The lack of progress by the BTK in ensuring a competitive playing field can be evidenced by the market share the incumbent still holds.  In broadband, the incumbent's provider still occupies roughly 95% share of the market.  The Governmental Audit Office of the President (T.C. Cumhurbaşkanlığı Devlet Denetleme Kurulu) issued a highly critical report of the BTK in February 2010, listing 115 findings to be addressed.  For example, the report found #20 points out that the BTK has completed only 50% to 78% of its stated work plans in each of the years from 2005 to 2008.

Alternative operators are rapidly growing, yet much progress needs to be made by the BTK to improve the competitive landscape.

The political authority is the Ministry of Transport, Maritime and Communication . But there are also two supreme councils; Radio and Television Supreme Council (RTÜK) and Information and Communication Technologies Authority (BTK). While internet and point to point telecommunication is controlled by BTK, radio and television broadcast is controlled by RTÜK.

Internet

Internet in Turkey has been available to the public since 1993, although experimentation at Ege University started in 1987. The first available connections were dial-up. Cable Internet has been available since 1998 and ADSL since 2001.

Internet users in Turkey reached 26.5 million in 2008, with a 34.5% penetration (up from 7.5% in 2004 and 13.9% in 2005), also thanks to internet cafés and workplace access. ADSL subscribers were 4.5 million in 2008. Only 7% of Turkish women used internet in 2009. Estimated internet penetration reached 51% in 2014.

Currently Türk Telekom's TTNET ADSL2+ service is the most widely used Internet service in Turkey, offering speeds from 8 Mbit/s to 24 Mbit/s. TTNET offers VDSL2 service with speeds at 25 Mbit/s to 100 Mbit/s as well. Alternative broadband companies, while mostly still using TTNET infrastructure, such as SmileADSL , Biri and TurkNet are also available. Superonline is offering fibre broadband in limited areas in 12 cities, though the company is enlarging at a healthy pace. They currently offer up to 1000 Mbit/s speeds. Furthermore, relatively wide but not universal coverage of cable Internet is maintained by UyduNET, offering speeds from 10 Mbit/s to 100 Mbit/s.

In March 2012, TTNet and Superonline, which between themselves provide the bulk of Turkish broadband Internet access, have started applying "fair use" policies (known with the Turkish abbreviations AKK for "Adil Kullanım Koşulları" and AKN for "Adil Kullanım Noktası") that are overly restrictive in terms of the allowed download and upload quotas. Most accounts are allotted 50 GB download (and 10 GB upload) quotas, after which the bandwidth is reduced 10-fold, down to 1 Mbit/s. Some users have reported that their broadband speeds were reduced in six days into the month. Both companies have been under heavy criticism for their "fair use" policies.
The only ISP in turkey that offers no fair-use policies is TurkNet

All main newspapers and TV channels have internet websites, constantly updated. Yet, most news originate from news agencies and traditional media, and there is very little web-only content production.

In 2017, Wikipedia is blocked in Turkey. It's ban was relieved only in January 2020 after a court ruling which allowed Wikipedia being accessible in Turkey.

Media organizations

Media agencies

The main news agencies in Turkey are Anadolu Ajansı (AA), Demirören Haber Ajansı (DHA), İhlas Haber Ajansı (İHA), Ajans HaberTürk (Ciner Group) and ANKA. They often have access to expensive technical facilities thanks to being embedded in big media conglomerates.

Anadolu Ajansı (AA) was founded by Kemal Atatürk in 1920 during Turkey's independence war, and remains the official state-subsidized news agency. It has 28 offices in Turkey and 22 abroad, providing 800 news items and 200 photos daily.
Demirören Haber Ajansı (DHA), formerly owned by the Doğan Media Group and called Doğan Haber Ajansı, was founded in 1999. It is owned by the Demirören Group. In 2011 it had 41 offices in Turkey and 26 abroad.
ANKA was founded in 1972 as an independent news agency; it provides a daily economic bulletin in Turkish and a weekly one in English.
Dicle Haber Ajansı (DİHA) is an independent news agency established in 2002, providing services in Turkish, English and Kurdish.
 Foreign news agencies also operate in Turkey.

Trade unions

Part of the reason for journalistic weakness vis-a-vis owners is the lack of unions, as the International Federation of Journalists and European Federation of Journalists noted in 2002:
At the beginning of 1990s, workers of two major newspapers, Hürriyet and Milliyet, resigned from the union because of pressure from the employer (Aydin Dogan). Hostility from employers meant that some workplaces where there had been union organisation (including, for example, Tercüman, Günes, and the privately owned UBA news agency) were closed down. Union organisation was not possible in newspapers (Star, Radikal, and others) nor in radio and television companies which began their publication and broadcasting lives later on. The Sabah group and other media groups have never permitted union organisation. (IFJ/EFJ, 2002: 4)

Turkey's 2001 financial crisis further strengthened media owners' hands, as 3–5,000 journalists were fired, and the most troublesome ones targeted first.

Media professionals in Turkey face job insecurity and lack of social security, being often forced to work without contract and outside the protection provided by the Law 212 on the rights of journalists. Without a contact under Law 212 media workers in Turkey cannot obtain a press badge and cannot take part in the Turkish Journalists Union (Türkiye Gazeteciler Sendikası, TGS), the only union recognised as a counterpart for the negotiation of the category's collective contract. TGS' influence has diminished since the 1990s, under pressure from the media owners, and today journalists are cautious about union membership, in order to avoid retaliation from employers.

Despite low levels of unionisation, many journalists' associations exist, including Türkiye Gazeteciler Cemiyeti (Journalists Association of Turkey), Türkiye Gazeteciler Federasyonu (Federation of Journalists), Çağdaş Gazeteciler Derneği (Progressive Journalists Association), Ekonomi Muhabirleri Derneği (Association of Economy Reporters), Foto Muhabirleri Derneği (Association of Photo Reporters), and Parlamento Muhabirleri Derneği (Association of Parliamentary Reporters).

Employers organisations include Televizyon Yayıncıları Derneği (Association of Television Broadcasters), Anadolu Gazete Radyo ve Televizyon Yayıncıları Birliği (Union of Anatolian Newspaper, Radio and Television Publishers and Broadcasters), Televizyon Yayıncıları Birliği (Union of Television Broadcasters), Yayıncılar Birliği (Turkish Publishers’ Association).

The advertising sector include the Turkish Association of Advertising Agencies (TAAA) (Reklamcılar Derneği), Association of Advertisers (Reklamverenler Derneği) and IAA Turkey (International Advertising Association).

Regulatory authorities
The Radio and Television Supreme Council (RTÜK) is the government body overseeing the broadcast media.
It was established after the end of the state monopoly over broadcasting, with the Radio and Television Law no. 3984 in April 1994. It is tasked with assigning frequencies and issuing broadcasting permits and licenses to private companies, as well as monitoring their compliance with the legal framework. It has the power to issue penalties for non-compliance, ranging from warnings to the suspension of broadcastings (after complaints, since 2002 it can suspend single programmes rather than only the whole channel). It has no authority over the public service broadcaster TRT, which is subject to a separate law (no. 2954).

Broadcasting standards set by RTÜK are seen as too wide and vague, as in “not violating the national and moral values of the community and the Turkish family structure”, “not undermining the state and its independence and the indisputable unity of the country with its people” and “not undermining the ideals and reforms of Atatürk”. Its interpretation of the law has been both arbitrary and severe, with disproportionate sanctions for non-compliers. RTÜK's claim of impartiality is undermined by its composition and nomination process, leading to strong risks of politicisation and control by the party in government. The body members are elected by the Parliament, and are currently dominated by affiliates of the ruling AKP. According to Bianet, in 2014 RTÜK issued 78 warnings and 254 fines to television channels, and 12 warnings and 7 fines to radio stations.

Since 2002, in order to regulate the frequencies, RTÜK partners with the Communications High Council HYK, founded in 1983 to approve communication policies, and the Telecommunication Authority TK, established in 2000 to regulate and control the telecommunication sector. TK is tasked with frequency planning, yet frequency auctions have often been unsuccessful due to lack of coordination between the three bodies as well as outside pressures from media conglomerates. The MGK (National Security Council) also intervened to oblige broadcasters to acquire a national security clearance document, in order to prevent the establishment of religious TV channels. In 2010 all radio and TV stations continued operating without licenses.
As long as Turkish media operate without licenses, RTÜK cannot enact its powers and force media groups to sell their shares to prevent dominant positions and reduce media ownership concentration.

TİAK (Television Audience Research Committee), BİAK (Press Research Committee), and RİAK (Radio Audience Research. Committee) are established to organise and monitor research about broadcasting and print media.

BIA is a non-for-profit organization that monitors and reports violations of freedom of expression, monitors the newspapers’ coverage about human rights, woman and children rights issues, and the functioning of the media in terms of media ethics. Its news and information network Bianet provides daily coverage of the issues that are ignored in the mainstream media, especially about human rights, gender rights, minority rights and children rights issues. Bianet has also an English version.

Censorship and media freedom

Since 2011, the AKP government has increased restrictions on freedom of speech, freedom of the press and internet use, and television content, as well as the right to free assembly. It has also developed links with media groups, and used administrative and legal measures (including, in one case, a  billion tax fine) against critical media groups and critical journalists: "over the last decade the AKP has built an informal, powerful, coalition of party-affiliated businessmen and media outlets whose livelihoods depend on the political order that Erdogan is constructing. Those who resist do so at their own risk."

These behaviours became particularly prominent in 2013 in the context of the Turkish media coverage of the 2013 protests in Turkey. The BBC noted that while some outlets are aligned with the AKP or are personally close to Erdogan, "most mainstream media outlets - such as TV news channels HaberTurk and NTV, and the major centrist daily Milliyet - are loth to irritate the government because their owners' business interests at times rely on government support. All of these have tended to steer clear of covering the demonstrations." Few channels provided live coverage – one that did was Halk TV.

During its 12-year rule, the ruling AKP has gradually expanded its control over media. Today, numerous newspapers, TV channels and internet portals also dubbed as Yandaş Medya ("Slanted Media") or Havuz Medyası ("Pool Media") continue their heavy pro-government propaganda. Several media groups receive preferential treatment in exchange for AKP-friendly editorial policies. Some of these media organizations were acquired by AKP-friendly businesses through questionable funds and processes. Media not friendly to AKP, on the other hand, are threatened with intimidation, inspections and fines. These media group owners face similar threats to their other businesses. An increasing number of columnists have been fired for criticizing the AKP leadership.

Leaked telephone calls between high ranking AKP officials and businessmen indicate that government officials collected money from businessmen in order to create a "pool media" that will support AKP government at any cost.  Arbitrary tax penalties are assessed to force newspapers into bankruptcy—after which they emerge, owned by friends of the president. According to a recent investigation by Bloomberg, Erdogan forced a sale of the once independent daily Sabah to a consortium of businessmen led by his son-in-law.

The state-run Anadolu Agency and the Turkish Radio and Television Corporation have also been criticized by media outlets and opposition parties, for acting more and more like a mouthpiece for the ruling AKP, a stance in stark violation of their requirement as public institutions to report and serve the public in an objective way.

In the aftermath of the 2016 coup attempt, all media outlets considered to have been linked to the Gülen movement were shut down by the Turkish government. These include the newspapers Zaman (formerly the highest-circulation paper in Turkey) and Taraf, Cihan News Agency, Samanyolu TV and numerous others. Later in the same year, some pro-Kurdish media outlets, such as IMC TV, were also shut down for allegedly supporting the PKK.

Former publications

In the post-Tanzimat period French became a common language among educated people, even though no ethnic group in the empire natively spoke French. Johann Strauss, author of "Language and power in the late Ottoman Empire," wrote that "In a way reminiscent of English in the contemporary world, French was almost omnipresent in the Ottoman lands." Strauss also stated that French was "a sort of semi-official language", which "to some extent" had "replaced Turkish as an 'official' language for non-Muslims". Therefore, late empire had multiple French-language publications, and several continued to operate when the Republic of Turkey was declared in 1923. However French-language publications began to close in the 1930s.

From 1923 onwards:

 İctihâd - Idjtihad. Türkçe ve Fransızca, ilmi, edebi, iktisadi
 T. C. İzmir Ticaret ve Sanayi Odası Mecmuası - République de Turque Bulletin de la Chambre de Commerce et d'Industrie de Smyrne
 Revue commerciale du Levant (Constantinople, with the entire city named Istanbul in Turkish in 1923 and renamed Istanbul in English circa 1930) - of the French chamber of commerce

See also
 List of magazines in Turkey
 List of newspapers in Turkey
 List of television stations in Turkey
 List of radio stations in Turkey
 Censorship in Turkey
 Transparency of media ownership in Turkey
 Concentration of media ownership in Turkey
 Media censorship and disinformation during the 2013–14 protests in Turkey
 Turkey's media purge after the failed July 2016 coup d'état
 Conspiracy theories in Turkey
 Media of the Ottoman Empire

References

Further reading
 Mine Gencel Bek (2004), "Research Note: Tabloidization of News Media: An Analysis of Television News in Turkey", European Journal of Communication August 2004 19: 371–386, doi:10.1177/0267323104045264 
 Christensen, M. (2010), "Notes on the public sphere on a national and post-national axis: Journalism and freedom of expression in Turkey", Global Media and Communication, 6 (2), pp. 177–197. 
 Hawks, B.B. (2011), "Is the press really free?: The recent conflict between the government and media in Turkey", International Journal of the Humanities, 8 (11), pp. 75–90.
 Tunc, Asli; Gorgulu, Vehbi (2012). Mapping Digital Media: Turkey. London: Open Society Foundations.

External links
 Freedom House 2015 Turkey report
 EJC Media Landscapes, Turkey
 ECPMF Resource Centre on Media Freedom, Turkey
 OSCE Freedom of the Media statements on Turkey
 Reporters Without Borders, Turkey
 Committee for the Protection of Journalists (CPJ), Turkey
 Marc Pierini with Markus Mayr, January 2013, Press Freedom in Turkey, Carnegie Endowment for International Peace
 Dilek Kurban, Ceren Sözeri, June 2012, Caught in the Wheels of Power: The Political, Legal and Economic Constraints on Independent Media and Freedom of the Press in Turkey, Turkish Economic and Social Studies Foundation. 
 Piotr Zalewski, Foreign Affairs, June 14, 2013, The Turkish Media’s Darkest Hour: How Erdogan Got the Protest Coverage He Wanted
 Akser, Murat; Baybars-Hawks, Banu (2012), "Media and Democracy in Turkey: Toward a Model of Neoliberal Media Autocracy", Middle East Journal of Culture and Communication, Volume 5, Number 3, 2012, pp. 302–321(20)

 
Turkey
Turkey
Turkey